The following are German-born or Germany-based architects listed according to their architectural style.

Gothic
Adam Kraft (or Krafft) (c. 1460? – January 1509)

Renaissance

Joseph Heintz (1564–1609) 
Elias Holl (1573–1646)

Baroque

Cosmas Damian Asam (1686–1739)
Egid Quirin Asam (1692–1750)
George Bähr (1666–1738)
François de Cuvilliés (1695–1768)
Johann Dientzenhofer (1663–1726)
Johann Michael Fischer (1692–1766)
Anselm Franz von Ritter zu Groenesteyn (1692–1765)
Georg Wenzeslaus von Knobelsdorff (1699–1753)
Balthasar Neumann (1687–1753) also an engineer
Matthäus Daniel Pöppelmann (1662–1736)
Johann Conrad Schlaun (1695–1773)
Dominikus Zimmermann (1685–1766)

Neoclassicism

Carl Ludvig Engel (1778–1840)
Frederick William von Erdmannsdorff (1736–1800)
Friedrich Gilly (1772–1800)
Carl von Gontard (1731–1791)
Leo von Klenze (1784–1864)
Carl Gotthard Langhans (1732–1808)
Karl Friedrich Schinkel (1781–1841) also a painter
Paul Ludwig Simon (1771–1815) also a scientist
Friedrich Weinbrenner (1766–1826)

Romanesque revival 
Heinrich Hübsch (1795–1863)
August Soller (1805–1853)

Historicism

Hermann Eggert (1844–1920)
Friedrich von Gärtner (1791–1847)
Richard Lucae (1829–1877)
Georg Hermann Nicolai (1812–1881)
Franz Heinrich Schwechten (1841–1924)
Gottfried Semper (1803–1879)

Architectural realism

Constantin Lipsius (1832–1894)
Paul Wallot (1841–1912)

Art Nouveau 

Fritz Schumacher (1869–1947) also an urban designer
Carl Moritz (1863–1944)

Traditionalism
Rudolf Jacobs (1879–1946)

Expressionism

Dominikus Böhm (1880–1955)
Fritz Höger (1877–1949)
Erich Mendelsohn (1887–1953)
Hans Poelzig (1869–1936)
Alfred Runge (1881–1946)
Eduard Scotland (1885–1945)

Organic

Hugo Haring (1882–1958)
Hans Scharoun (1893–1972)

Neue Moderne

Carl Weidemeyer (1882–1976)
Peter Behrens (1868–1940)
Eberhard Gildemeister (1897–1978)
Walter Hohmann (1880–1945) also a civil engineer
Rudolf Jacobs (1879–1946)
Paul Schneider-Esleben (1915–2005)
Bruno Taut (1880–1938)
Emilie Winkelmann (1875–1951)

Bauhaus

Edmund Collein (1906–1992)
Erich Consemüller (1902–1957)
Walter Gropius (1883–1969)
Lucy Hillebrand (1906–1997)
Konrad Püschel (1907–1997)
Lotte Stam-Beese (1903–1988)

Nationalism

 Richard Ermisch (1885–1960), architect
 Wilhelm Kreis (1873–1955), architect
 Franz Ruff (1906–1979), architect
 Albert Speer (1905–1981), architect
 Paul Troost (1878–1934), architect

Internationalism

Stephan Braunfels (born 1950)
Dörte Gatermann (born 1956)
Helmut Jahn (1940–2021) also a designer
Ludwig Mies van der Rohe (1886–1969)

Deconstructivism

Günther Behnisch (1922–2010)
Elisabeth Böhm (1921–2012)
Gottfried Böhm (1920–2021)

High tech

Frei Otto (1925–2015) also a research scientist

Eco tech

Hans Kollhoff (born 1946)

Contemporary modernist

Annabelle Selldorf (born early 1960s) architect in New York
Sergei Enwerowitsch Tschoban (born 1962) Russian-born

Sustainable architecture

Anna Heringer (born 1977)
Christoph Ingenhoven (born 1960)

See also

 List of architects
 List of Germans

External links
www.germanarchitects.com
Worldwide Architect Ranking according to 12 international magazines

German
Architects